Adbhutham is a 2021 Indian Telugu-language science-fiction romance film directed by Mallik Ram from the screenplay of Lakshmi Bhupala and Prasanth Varma. The film stars Teja Sajja and Shivani Rajashekar. It was premiered on Disney+ Hotstar on November 19, 2021. The film received mixed reviews.

Plot 

Surya and Vennela standing on top of office building and near lake respectively want to commit suicide. It is shown that 12 hours before Surya gets up with dream of car accident and answers his friend's call asking him to reach office early as he was late for music director interview to be hosted by him. He gets an unknown call which he disconnects and also gets food from an unknown person. He gets call from another person asking him to participate in some competition, however, he gets lost in his thoughts about his father and about to meet with an accident, however, nothing happens. During the interview, Surya insults the music director and gets insulted by his manager who happens to be his father's friend. The manager says that him being adamant about music was the primary reason behind his father's death. Meanwhile, at Vennela's house, the groom and his family have come to see her. She tries to cancel the marriage fix in order to follow her dreams, however, it turns out that the groom wants to marry her. Also, her father wants her to get married as she is unable to clear entrance exam for the past two years. She assures her father that she will pass the entrance test this time. It turns out that she has failed in the mock test. Because of the reasons, each of them wants to commit suicide.

Surya  decides to message someone that he is  going to commit suicide. Confused by whom to message he messages himself. The message is received by Vennela and they start to fight as to how the other person is sending message to their own number. In this confusion, Surya aborts his plan to commit suicide and his friend also comes to his rescue. Vennela gets call from her father saying her grandmother had had a heart attack. After a series of confusion and conflicts between the two, they become friends with conditions, one of them being that they should not meet each other. One day Vennela comes across one of her friends that she was cheated by her online boyfriend who has asked her money as help and he never returned. So she decides to meet Surya at clock tower, to which he agrees. Both reach the place, however, the place where Surya happens to be has strong winds while that of Vennela happens to be sunny. Though Surya explains this to Vennela, she does not understand. Surya gets an umbrella from a kid and reaches home and calls Vennela. Vennela, feeling cheated that Surya wanted to get money from her, answers the call and starts to fight. During the fight, Surya asks her to watch television wherein news mention cyclone, however, Vennela tells him that news is all about Telangana agitations, to which Surya responds that separate Telangana state has already been declared on February 18, 2014. Then he realises that Vennela happens to be in 2014, when she confirms the date to be February 14, 2014, while he is in 2019.

Vennela feels that she has been cheated by Surya, however, she gets surprised when separate Telangana was announced on February 18 as the same Surya had said to her. She asks Surya to come to clock tower and wants to know any other incident which has happened on that day to confirm that they are from different timelines. Unable to figure out any incident, she scribbles on the bench where they both are sitting in their respective timelines, which Surya confirms. Both of them try meeting the other person in their respective timelines on the advise of Vennela's grandmother but to no avail. Time passes and their friendship blossoms. On one day, Vennela proposes to Surya while sitting on the same bench to which Surya says that he never had feelings for her and that he may not love any person as he was rejected by the person whom he loved. Vennela gets angry on him and cuts the phone. She gets proposed by an unknown person and she slaps him and rejects his proposal. The unknown person happens to be Surya. Vennela and her grandmother start drinking thinking about her rejection. Meanwhile, Surya calls Vennela to find out if she is alright and explains his story where he reveals about his life and how he fell in love, him getting rejected by his love, getting drunk and his father's death.

As her father wants to finalize marriage, she says that if she does not clear the entrance test, she will do as he says. Her grandmother comes up with an idea to get the answers from Surya in 2019 for 2014 exam. Vennela passes the exam with All India rank 87. Though her father is impressed by her, she feels guilty that she has cheated to which Surya asks her to disclose the same to her father. Surya, on his father's death anniversary, gets multiple calls from Vennela. When reverted, he realises that Vennela can save his father and guides her to the place where his father was found dead. It happens to be that his father died saving Vennela, who was being kidnapped by some thugs. Vennela realises the same but loses her phone during the tussle. She tries multiple times to meet Surya, however, she is unable to as the nature keeps stopping her meeting him. Not knowing any of this, Surya of 2019 tries contacting her but to no response as Vennela has lost her phone. Vennela's grandmother tells her that the nature does not want her to meet Surya and Surya in future does not have Vennela by his side. Surya, remembering one of the interactions with Vennela, goes to lake side where she keeps wishes in letters under Lord Rama idol. He reads one of those which has his father's last wish and finds the guitar which he loved as a gift. Surya decides to participate in music competition where he performs well.

Meanwhile, Surya asks one of his friends to find out what has happened to Vennela's number as be is unable to contact. His friend tells him that since the number was disabled in 2014, the same number was given to Surya. She also mentions that Vennela has died in a car accident on the same day as his performance. Looking at the newspaper, Surya understands that Vennela is none other than the person whom he proposed. Surya of 2014 receives his father's belongings and comes across Vennela's mobile phone and calls the last number. Surya of 2019 answers the call and realises that it's Surya of 2014 on the other side. He guides Surya of 2014 to reach Vennela and save her from her impending death. However, Vennela's car meets with accident. Surya, dejected, goes to the clock tower. He finds Vennela standing behind him and they hug each other. It is shown that Vennela sees one of Surya's friends and gets out of the car before car is met with accident. She explains that she left for higher studies after listening to her grandmother and since she came back, she tried meeting him but everytime she tried, there's some harm to his life, one of which happens to be the incident shown in the beginning. She mentions that she was always around him as she is the one who used to order him food daily and also she is the one who gave him umbrella. She also mentions that she waited for the day she lost her mobile phone in order to meet him and that happens to be the day of his performance. They understand that whatever has happened is nature driven and are brought together after each of them has fulfilled their goals.

Cast 
 Teja Sajja as Surya
 Shivani Rajashekar as Vennela
 Sathya as Prasad, Surya's friend
 Sivaji Raja as Chandra Mohan,  Surya's father
 Devi Prasad as Vennala's father

Soundtrack
The soundtrack was composed by Radhan and released by Lahari Music.

Release
Initially planned as a theatrical film and a debut for both the leading actors, the film was postponed and eventually premiered on Disney+ Hotstar on November 19, 2021.

Reception 
Mukesh Manjunath writing for Film Companion praised the film to be one of the best entertainers of the year. Sangeetha Devi Dundoo writing for The Hindu, noted that this science fiction romance comedy does not leverage on its interesting premise.

References

External links 

 at Disney+ Hotstar

2020s Telugu-language films
2021 direct-to-video films
2021 films
Film productions suspended due to the COVID-19 pandemic
Films not released in theaters due to the COVID-19 pandemic
Films postponed due to the COVID-19 pandemic
Films shot in Hyderabad, India
Disney+ Hotstar original films
Indian direct-to-video films
Telugu-language Disney+ Hotstar original programming
Films set in Hyderabad, India
Films set in 2014
Indian science fiction comedy films
Indian science fiction films
2021 science fiction films